Brian Worth (30 July 1914 – 25 August 1978) was an English actor, known for Scrooge (1951), The Man in the White Suit (1951) and An Inspector Calls (1954).
He died on 25 August 1978 aged 64.

Educated in Britain and America, he learnt the technical side of commercial advertising films before deciding to turn to acting.
During the Second World War he served in the armed forces (1941–1946)He was an officer in the SOE and worked out of Algeria and then Seville,based at the British embassy, escorting  agents over the Pyrenees into France ,and exfiltrating agents and escaped airmen  back to “neutral”Spain.

 Between 1946 and 1947 he acted on stage.

During the first half of the 1950s, Worth had prominent supporting roles in over a dozen films, including playing the progressive teacher Mr Judd in Tom Brown's Schooldays (1951). From 1956, his roles grew smaller, although his later film appearances did include four for noted director Michael Powell as well as a small role in a Bond movie, On Her Majesty's Secret Service (1969).
He and his Spanish wife Tere ran a popular Spanish restaurant in a basement in Draycott Avenue Chelsea in the 60s and 70s.The family lived in York Mansions Battersea in the 60s and Addison Road, Holland Park in the 70s.

Filmography

Television 
He played the part of Peter Corrio in The Saint in the 4th Episode of the 4th Season (1965) The Smart Detective. In The Prisoner TV series (1967-68) episode Many Happy Returns he played an RAF Group Captain.

References

External links 
 

English male film actors
English male television actors
English male stage actors
1914 births
1978 deaths
20th-century English male actors